Marvin Leonel Esch (August 4, 1927 – June 19, 2010) was an American politician from the U.S. state of Michigan and a member of the Republican Party. He served in the U.S. House of Representatives from 1967 to 1977 before unsuccessfully seeking a seat in the United States Senate in the 1976 election. Following his political career, Esch became active in business and political activism, becoming director of public affairs for the U.S. Steel Corporation and director of programs and seminars for the American Enterprise Institute.

Biography

Esch was born in Flinton in Cambria County, Pennsylvania. He received his secondary education in Akron, Ohio, and Jackson, Michigan. He attended the University of Michigan at Ann Arbor, earning an A.B. in 1950, an M.A. in 1951, and a Ph.D. in 1957. He served in the U.S. Maritime Service and the United States Army. He was a member of the faculty at Wayne State University, Detroit, Michigan and a member of the Michigan State House of Representatives, 1965–1966.

Political activity

In 1966, Esch defeated former U.S. Representative George Meader in the Republican primary elections for Michigan's 2nd congressional district. He went on to defeat incumbent Democrat Wes E. Vivian, one of the "Five Fluke Freshmen", in the general election to be elected to the 90th United States Congress. He was re-elected to the four succeeding Congresses, serving from January 3, 1967 to January 3, 1977. He was not a candidate for reelection to the Ninety-fifth Congress in 1976, but was an unsuccessful candidate for election to the United States Senate, losing in the general election to Democrat Donald W. Riegle, Jr.  He won 47% of the vote in that race.

Post-political career

He was director of public affairs for the U.S. Steel Corporation, 1977–1980; the director of programs and seminars for the American Enterprise Institute, 1981–1987; and a private advocate. He was an emeritus trustee of the John F. Kennedy Center for the Performing Arts. He was a resident of Ann Arbor, Michigan.

References
 retrieved 3 April 2011
The Political Graveyard
Our People: The Board of Trustees, Kennedy Center Administration
"Former U.S. Congressman Marvin Esch of Ann Arbor dies", by Juliana Keeping, AnnArbor.com

1927 births
2010 deaths
People from Cambria County, Pennsylvania
Republican Party members of the United States House of Representatives from Michigan
Republican Party members of the Michigan House of Representatives
20th-century American politicians
University of Michigan alumni
Wayne State University faculty
American Enterprise Institute
Military personnel from Pennsylvania